The 1988 Summer Olympics were held in Seoul, South Korea from September 17 to October 2.

Archery

Athletics

Men

 † = Ben Johnson led the 100 metres at 9.79sec but was disqualified for doping.

Women

 * = Athletes who ran in preliminary rounds and also received medals.

Basketball

Boxing

Canoeing

Men's events

Women's events

Cycling

Men's

Women's

Diving

Men

Women

Equestrian

Fencing

Men

Women

Field hockey

Football

Note: The players above the line played at least one game in this tournament, the players below the line were only squad members. Nevertheless, the International Olympic Committee medal database credits them all as medalists.

Gymnastics

Men's

Women's

Handball

Judo

Modern pentathlon

Rowing

Men's events

Women's events

Sailing

Women's event

Men's events

Open events

Shooting

Men's events

Women's events

Mixed events

Swimming

Men's events

* Swimmers who participated in the heats only and received medals.

Women's events

* Swimmers who participated in the heats only and received medals.

Synchronized swimming

Table tennis

Tennis

Volleyball

Water polo

Weightlifting

Mitko Grablev (56 kg) and Angel Guenchev (67.5 kg) of Bulgaria originally won their respective weight classes, but were both disqualified after they tested positive for Furosemide. Andor Szanyi of Hungary was originally awarded silver in the 100 kg event, but was disqualified after he tested positive for Stanozolol.

Wrestling

Freestyle

Greco-Roman

See also
 1988 Summer Olympics medal table

References

External links

 
 

Medalists
1988